Special education (known as special-needs education, aided education, exceptional education, alternative provision, exceptional student education, special ed., SDC, or SPED) is the practice of educating students in a way that accommodates their individual differences, disabilities, and special needs. This involves the individually planned and systematically monitored arrangement of teaching procedures, adapted equipment and materials, and accessible settings. These interventions are designed to help individuals with special needs achieve a higher level of personal self-sufficiency and success in school and in their community, which may not be available if the student were only given access to a typical classroom education.

Special education aims to provide accommodated education for disabled students such as learning disabilities, learning difficulties (such as dyslexia), communication disorders, emotional and behavioral disorders, physical disabilities (such as osteogenesis imperfecta, cerebral palsy, lissencephaly, Emanuel syndrome, and muscular dystrophy, developmental disabilities (such as autism spectrum disorder and intellectual disabilities) and other disabilities. Disabled students are likely to benefit from additional educational services such as different approaches to teaching, the use of technology, a specifically adapted teaching area, a resource room, or a separate classroom.

Some scholars of education may categorize gifted education under the umbrella of "special education," but this pedagogical approach is different from special education because of the students' capabilities. Intellectual giftedness is a difference in learning and can also benefit from specialized teaching techniques or different educational programs, but the term "special education" is generally used to specifically indicate instruction of disabled students.

Whereas special education is designed specifically for students with learning disabilities, remedial education can be designed for any students, with or without special needs; the defining trait is simply that they have reached a point of unpreparedness, regardless of why. For example, if a person's education was disrupted, for example, by internal displacement during civil disorder or a war.

In most developed countries, educators modify teaching methods and environments so that the maximum number of students are served in general education environments. Integration can reduce social stigmas and improve academic achievement for many students.

The opposite of special education is general education, also known as mainstream education. General education is the standard curriculum presented without special teaching methods or supports. Sometimes special education classrooms and general special education classrooms mix. This is called an inclusive classroom.

History
In the past, most students with special needs have been excluded from school. Such exclusion still affects about 23 million disabled children worldwide, particularly in poor, rural areas of developing countries.

Identifying students or learners with special needs
Some children are easily identified as candidates for special needs due to their medical history. For example, they may have been diagnosed with a genetic condition that is associated with intellectual disability, may have various forms of brain damage, may have a developmental disorder, may have visual or hearing disabilities, or other disabilities.

On the other hand, for students with less obvious disabilities, such as those who have borderline intellectual disability or specific learning difficulties (dyslexia, dyscalculia, etc.), two primary methods have been used for identifying them: the discrepancy model and the response to intervention model. The discrepancy model depends on the teacher noticing that the students' achievements are noticeably below what is expected, at which point the teacher may make the decision for the student to receive support from a special education specialist. Before doing so, the teacher must show documentation of low academic achievement. The response to intervention model advocates earlier intervention.

In the discrepancy model, a student receives special education services for a specific learning difficulty (SLD) if the student has at least normal intelligence and the student's academic achievement is below what is expected of a student with his or her IQ. Although the discrepancy model has dominated the school system for many years, there has been substantial criticism of this approach (e.g., Aaron, 1995, Flanagan and Mascolo, 2005) among researchers. One reason for criticism is that diagnosing SLDs on the basis of the discrepancy between achievement and IQ does not predict the effectiveness of treatment. Low academic achievers who also have low IQ appear to benefit from treatment just as much as low academic achievers who have normal or high intelligence.

The alternative approach, response to intervention, identifies children who are having difficulties in school in their first or second year after starting school. They then receive additional assistance such as participating in a reading remediation program. The response of the children to this intervention then determines whether they are designated as having a learning disability. Those few who still have trouble may then receive designation and further assistance. Sternberg (1999) has argued that early remediation can greatly reduce the number of children meeting diagnostic criteria for learning disabilities. He has also suggested that the focus on learning disabilities and the provision of accommodations in school fails to acknowledge that people have a range of strengths and weaknesses and places undue emphasis on academics by insisting that students should be supported in this area and not in music or sports.

Individual needs

A special education program should be customized to address each student's needs. Special educators provide a continuum of services, in which students with various disabilities receive multiple degrees of support based on their individual needs. It is crucial for special education programs to be individualized so that they address the unique combination of needs in a given student.

In the United States, Canada, and the UK, educational professionals use a student's Individualized Education Program (IEP). Another name for a student's Individualized Education Plan is a student's Individual Learning Plan (ILP).

"The IEP is meant to address each child’s unique learning issues and include specific educational goals. It is a legally binding document [in the US]. The school must provide everything it promises in the IEP."

In the US, for children who are not yet three years old, an Individual Family Service Plan (IFSP) contains information on the child's present level of development in all areas; outcomes for the child and family; and services the child and family will receive to help them achieve the outcomes.

In the United States, the Individuals with Disabilities Education Act (IDEA) is a federal law that requires every school system to provide a free and appropriate public education for every child, ages 3 to 22, regardless of how or how seriously that child may be disabled.  To ensure that this federal law is obeyed, the government requires every school system provide this type of education to each student in order to receive federal funding. This changed a little in 2004 when the Individuals with Disabilities Education Act (IDEA) decided to update the law. After the law was updated into the Disabilities Education Improvement Act, the ability to identify special needs children and give them the appropriate education environment was improved.

Students with all forms of special needs are assessed to determine their specific strengths and weaknesses.  The earlier these students with special needs are assessed, the faster they get the accommodations that they need, and the better it is for their education.  Placement, resources, and goals are determined on the basis of the student's needs.  Accommodations and modifications to the regular program may include changes in the curriculum, supplementary aids or equipment, and the provision of specialized physical adaptations that allow students to participate in the educational environment as much as possible. Students may need this help to access subject matter, physically gain access to the school, or meet their emotional needs. For example, if the assessment determines that the student cannot write by hand because of a physical disability, then the school might provide a computer for typing assignments, or allow the student to answer questions verbally instead. If the school determines that the student is severely distracted by the normal activities in a large, busy classroom, then the student might be placed in a smaller classroom such as a separate classroom or resource room.

Parents of students with a learning disability must be aware of what type of disability their child has, so they can get access to accommodations such as speech therapy, occupational therapy and adaptive physical education. For example, if a student takes an academic test and it indicates that the student struggles with reading comprehension, parents can request speech and language support or classroom accommodations, such as extra time to complete reading and writing tasks.

Methods of provision
In most developed countries, schools use different approaches to providing special education services to students. These approaches can be broadly grouped into four categories, according to how much contact the student with special needs has with non-disabled students (using North American terminology):

 Inclusion: In this approach, students with special needs spend all, or most of the school day with students who do not have special needs. Due to the fact that inclusion can require substantial modification of the general curriculum, most schools use it only for selected students with mild to moderate special needs, which is accepted as a best practice. Specialized services may be provided inside or outside the regular classroom, depending on the type of service. Students may occasionally leave the regular classroom to attend smaller, more intensive instructional sessions in a separate classroom, resource room, or to receive other related services that might require specialised equipment or might be disruptive to the rest of the class, such as speech and language therapy, occupational therapy, physical therapy, rehabilitation counseling. They might also leave the regular classroom for services that require privacy, such as counseling sessions with a social worker.
 Mainstreaming refers to the practice of educating students with special needs in classes with non-disabled students during specific time periods based on their skills. Students with special needs are segregated in separate classrooms exclusively for students with special needs for the rest of the school day.
 Segregation in a separate classroom or special school for students with special needs: In this model, students with special needs do not attend classes with non-disabled students. Segregated students may attend the same school where regular classes are provided, but spend all instructional time exclusively in a separate classroom for students with various disabilities. If their special class is located in an ordinary school, they may be provided opportunities for social integration outside the classroom, such as by eating meals with non-disabled students. Alternatively, these students may attend a special school. It may also occur when a student is in hospital, housebound, or detained by the criminal justice system. These students may receive one-on-one instruction or group instruction. Students who have been suspended or expelled are not considered segregated in this sense.
 ‘’Co-teaching:’’ In this setting, disabled students are placed in a general education classroom to learn along with their disabled peers and non-disabled peers. A General Education teacher and a Special Education teacher work as partners in instruction. Types of co-teaching include "one teaching/one helping" in which one teacher instructs while the other circulates around the class to evaluate and offer help, "parallel teaching" in which both teachers teach the same content to two groups of students of equal size, "station teaching" in which both teachers present differing content to different groups of students simultaneously and students rotate through each station, "alternative teaching" in which one teacher works with a smaller group or individual students while the other works with the rest of the class, and "team teaching" in which both teachers plan and teach a lesson together.

Effective instruction for disabled students

 Goal Directed: Each child must have an individualized Education Program (IEP) that distinguishes their particular needs. The child must get the services that are designed for them. These services will allow them to reach their annual goals which will be assessed at the end of each term along with short-term goals that will be assessed every few months.
 Research-Based Methods- There has been a lot of research done about disabled students and the best way to teach them. Testing, IQs, interviews, the discrepancy model, etc. should all be used to determine where to place the child. Once that is determined, the next step is the best way for the child to learn. There are plenty of different programs such as the Wilson Reading Program and Direct Instruction
 Guided by student performance- While the IEP goals may be assessed every few months to a year, constant informal assessments must take place. These assessments will guide instruction for the teacher. The teacher will be able to determine if the material is too difficult or too easy.

Special schools
A special school is a school catering for students who have special educational needs due to learning difficulties, physical disabilities, or behavioral problems. Special schools may be specifically designed, staffed and resourced to provide appropriate special education for children with additional needs. Students attending special schools generally do not attend any classes in mainstream schools.

Special schools provide individualized education, addressing specific needs. Student to teacher ratios are kept low, often 6:1 or lower depending upon the needs of the children. Special schools will also have other facilities for children with special needs, such as soft play areas, sensory rooms, or swimming pools, which are necessary for treating students with certain conditions.

In recent times, places available in special schools are declining as more children with special needs are educated in mainstream schools. However, there will always be some children, whose learning needs cannot be appropriately met in a regular classroom setting and will require specialized education and resources to provide the level of support they require. An example of a disability that may require a student to attend a special school is intellectual disability. However, this practice is often frowned upon by school districts in the US in the light of Least Restrictive Environment as mandated in the Individuals with Disabilities Education Act.

An alternative is a special unit or special classroom, also called a self-contained classroom, which is a separate classroom dedicated solely to the education of students with special needs within a larger school that also provides general education. This classroom is typically staffed by a specially trained teacher, who provides specific, individualized instruction to individuals and small groups of students with special needs. Separate classrooms, because they are located in a general education school, may have students who remain in the separate classroom full-time, or students who are mainstreamed in certain general education classes. An alternative to the separate classroom full-time for a student would be a one-to-one aide in the general education setting. In the United States, a one-on-one aide for a student with a disability is called a paraprofessional. In the United States a part-time alternative that is appropriate for some students is sometimes called a resource room. Another alternative would be attending a separate classroom for a specific subject such as social studies.

History of special schools
One of the first special schools in the world was the Institut National des Jeunes Aveugles in Paris, which was founded in 1784. It was the first school in the world to teach blind students. The first school in U.K. for the Deaf was established 1760 in Edinburgh by Thomas Braidwood, with education for visually impaired people beginning in the Edinburgh and Bristol in 1765.

In the 19th century, people with disabilities and the inhumane conditions where they were supposedly housed and educated were addressed in the literature of Charles Dickens. Dickens characterized people with severe disabilities as having the same, if not more, compassion and insight in Bleak House and Little Dorrit.

Such attention to the downtrodden conditions of people with disabilities brought resulted in reforms in Europe including the re-evaluation of special schools. In the United States reform came more slowly. Throughout the mid half of the 20th century, special schools, termed institutions, were not only accepted, but encouraged. disabled students were housed with people with mental illnesses, and they were not educated much, if at all.

Deinstitutionalization proceeded in the US beginning in the 1970s following the exposes of the institutions, and it has taken sometime before the Education for All Handicapped Children's Act of 1974, to the Individuals with Disabilities Education Act (IDEA) and then Individuals with Disabilities Educational Improvement Act (IDEIA) have come into fruition. School integration was supported as early as the 1970s, and teacher preparation programs in higher education have carefully taught and instructed graduates on inclusion at the classroom, individual, school, and district levels for decades resulting in dual certification of "regular teachers".

With the Amendments to the Individuals with Disabilities Education Act of 1997, school districts in the United States began to slowly integrate students with moderate and severe special needs into regular school systems. This changed the form and function of special education services in many school districts and special schools subsequently saw a steady decrease in enrollment as districts weighed the cost per student. It also posed general funding dilemmas to certain local schools and districts, changed how schools view assessments, and formally introduced the concept of inclusion to many educators, students and parents.

Instructional strategies

The student can be taught in either a classroom or outside environment. Both environments can be interactive for the student to engage better with the subject.

Different instructional techniques are used for some students with special educational needs. Instructional strategies are classified as being either accommodations or modifications.

An accommodation is a reasonable adjustment to teaching practices so that the student learns the same material, but in a format that is more accessible to the student. Accommodations may be classified by whether they change the presentation, response, setting, or scheduling of lessons. For example, the school may accommodate a student with visual impairments by providing a large-print textbook. This is a presentation accommodation. A modification changes or adapts the material to make it simpler. Modifications may change what is learned, how difficult the material is, what level of mastery the student is expected to achieve, whether or how the student is assessed, or any other aspect of the curriculum. For example, the school may modify a reading assignment for a student with reading difficulties by substituting a shorter, easier book. A student may receive both accommodations and modifications.

Examples of modifications
 Skipping subjects: Students may be taught less information than typical students, skipping over material that the school deems inappropriate for the student's abilities or less important than other subjects. For example, students with poor fine motor skills may be taught to print block letters, but not cursive handwriting.
 Simplified assignments: Students may read the same literature as their peers but have a simpler version, such as Shakespeare with both the original text and a modern paraphrase available.
 Shorter assignments: Students may do shorter homework assignments or take shorter, more concentrated tests.
 Extra aids: If students have deficiencies in working memory, a list of vocabulary words, called a word bank, can be provided during tests, to reduce lack of recall and increase chances of comprehension. Students might use a calculator when other students do not.
 Extended time: Students with a slower processing speed may benefit from extended time for assignments and/or tests in order to have more time to comprehend questions, recall information, and synthesize knowledge.
 Students can be offered a flexible setting in which to take tests. These settings can be a new location to provide for minimal distractions.

Examples of accommodations
 Response accommodations: Typing homework assignments rather than hand-writing them (considered a modification if the subject is learning to write by hand). Having someone else write down answers given verbally.
 Presentation accommodations: Examples include listening to audiobooks rather than reading printed books. These may be used as substitutes for the text, or as supplements intended to improve the students' reading fluency and phonetic skills. Similar options include designating a person to read to the student, or providing text to speech software. This is considered a modification if the purpose of the assignment is reading skills acquisition. Other presentation accommodations may include designating a person to take notes during lectures or using a talking calculator rather than one with only a visual display.
 Setting accommodations: Taking a test in a quieter room. Moving the class to a room that is physically accessible, e.g., on the first floor of a building or near an elevator. Arranging seating assignments to benefit the student, e.g., by sitting at the front of the classroom.
 Scheduling accommodations: Students may be given rest breaks or extended time on tests (may be considered a modification, if speed is a factor in the test). Use a timer to help with time management.  Students with a disability that can flare up unexpectedly may be allowed to turn in an assignment or take a test shortly after the episode has resolved.  This system, called flexible deadlines, treats an occasional, unexpected episode of illness or incapacity caused by a disability similar to an equivalent episode of an unexpected viral infection.  These students or their families should inform the teachers of the problem and turn in the missed work soon after the student is well enough to return to school (typically, one to three days after the return to class).

All developed countries permit or require some degree of accommodation for students with special needs, and special provisions are usually made in examinations which take place at the end of formal schooling.

In addition to how the student is taught the academic curriculum, schools may provide non-academic services to the student. These are intended ultimately to increase the student's personal and academic abilities. Related services include developmental, corrective, and other supportive services as are required to assist a student with learning disabilities and includes speech and language pathology, audiology, psychological services, physical therapy, occupational therapy, counseling services, music therapy, including rehabilitation counseling, orientation and mobility services, medical services as defined by regulations, parent counseling and training, school health services, school social work, assistive technology, other appropriate developmental or corrective support services, appropriate access to recreation and other support services. In some countries, most related services are provided by the schools; in others, they are provided by the normal healthcare and social services systems.

As an example, students who have poor impulse control, behavioral challenges, or are autistic may learn self-management techniques, be kept closely on a comfortingly predictable schedule, or given extra cues to signal activities.

A university field, termed severe disabilities, also is taught throughout the US university sector in schools of education. Advanced instruction is based upon community-referenced instruction, and alignment with transition to adulthood and progressive community practices.

Rehabilitation counseling personnel are often association with supported employment services, and typically with "transition to adulthood" in which multi-decade recommendations for better coordination between the school and the community service sectors have been made at the federal and university levels.

Issues within special education
At-risk students (those with educational needs that are not associated with a disability) are often placed in classes with disabled students. Critics assert that placing at-risk students in the same classes as disabled students may impede the educational progress of disabled people.
Some special education classes such as separate classroom and resource room have been criticized for a watered-down curriculum.

The practice of inclusion (in mainstream classrooms) has been criticized by advocates and some parents of children with special needs because some of these students require instructional methods that differ dramatically from typical classroom methods. Critics assert that it is not possible to deliver effectively two or more very different instructional methods in the same classroom. As a result, the educational progress of students who depend on different instructional methods to learn often fall even further behind their peers.

Parents of typically developing children sometimes fear that the special needs of a single "fully included" student will take critical levels of attention and energy away from the rest of the class and thereby impair the academic achievements of all students.

Linked to this, there is debate about the extent to which disabled students, whether in mainstream or special settings, should have a specific pedagogy, based on the scientific study of particular diagnostic categories, or whether general instructional techniques are relevant to all students including those with special needs.

Some parents, advocates, and students have concerns about the eligibility criteria and their application. In some cases, parents and students protest the students' placement into special education programs. For example, a student may be placed into the special education programs due to a mental health condition such as obsessive compulsive disorder, depression, anxiety, panic attacks or ADHD, while the student and his parents believe that the condition is adequately managed through medication and outside therapy. In other cases, students whose parents believe they require the additional support of special education services are denied participation in the program based on the eligibility criteria.

Whether it is useful and appropriate to attempt to educate the most severely disabled children, such as children who are in a persistent vegetative state, is debated. While many severely disabled children can learn simple tasks, such as pushing a buzzer when they want attention, some children may be incapable of learning. Some parents and advocates say that these children would be better served by substituting improved physical care for any academic program. In other cases, they question whether teaching such non-academic subjects, such as pushing a buzzer, is properly the job of the school system, rather than the health care system.

Another large issue is the lack of resources enabling individuals with special needs to receive an education in the developing world. As a consequence, 98 percent of children with special needs in developing countries do not have access to education.

Another issue would be budget cuts. Cuts can affect special education students who don't have access to proper equipment or education. The National Coalition for Personal Shortages did a survey and almost 100% of the teachers said that they are not able to give the proper rights to disabled children. Teachers are getting cut off from work due to the budget cuts.

There is a financial debate that covers the use and allotment of special education government funding. The three views on this topic are that too much money is already spent, not enough money is being spent, or that the money that is given isn't being spent properly. The argument for the first is that the amount of money spent on one special needs child is enough to cover a large group of general education students, and sometimes even causes several students to experience budget cuts on general programs to support one child. The evidence for special education not having enough money is the lack of teachers, burnt out teachers and a limited variety of teaching tools for each student. The argument to spend the money differently states that there is a lot of money set aside, but that it is being wasted by spending too much time on paperwork, inefficient IEP meetings or spending money on things that don't actually benefit the child.

Global issues 
Disabled children are often denied their right to education. However, little is known about their school attendance patterns. The collection of data on children with disabilities is not straightforward, but data are vital to ensure that policies are in place to address the constraints these children face.

By one estimate, 93 million children under age 14, or 5.1% of the world's children, were living with a 'moderate or severe disability' in 2004. According to the World Health Survey, in 14 of 15 low and middle income countries, disabled people of working age were about one-third less likely to have completed primary school. For example, in Bangladesh, 30% of people with disabilities had completed primary school, compared with 48% of those with no disabilities. The corresponding shares were 43% and 57% in Zambia; 56% and 72% in Paraguay.

It has been shown that children with a higher risk of disability are far more likely to be denied a chance to go to school. In Bangladesh, Bhutan and Iraq, children with mental impairments were most likely to be denied this right. In Iraq, for instance, 10% of 6- to 9-year-olds with no risk of disability had never been to school in 2006, but 19% of those at risk of having a hearing impairment and 51% of those who were at higher risk of mental disability had never been to school. In Thailand, almost all 6- to 9-year-olds who had no disability had been to school in 2005/06, and yet 34% of those with walking or moving impairments had never been to school.

Disabled children require access to services that can support them throughout their time in school, such as more individual attention from instructors. According to the United Nations Centre for Human Rights, about 2% of children with disabilities have access to these services. Those without access to these services are excluded from education and unable to attend school. Due to the need of certain services and facilities, the estimated cost of providing education for a disabled child is 2.3 times higher than a child without disabilities. Given the poverty levels in a variety of developing countries, the education of children with disabilities does not become a priority. Children with physical disabilities are less likely to attend school in comparison with students who do not have a disability and children with an intellectual ability are even less likely than children with physical disabilities. In the Global South, 90% of children with some form of disability do not receive any form of structured education. While current initiatives toward inclusive education internationally have been implemented, such as the Education for All program, some countries in the Global South still challenge the lack of ability to provide children with disabilities access to education due to issues such as lack of resources and schools being overcrowded.

National approaches

Africa
South Africa
White Papers in 1995 and 2001 discuss special education in the country. Local schools are given some independent authority.

Both modifications and accommodations are recommended, depending on the student's individual needs.

Nigeria
The Federal Ministry of Education constituted a committee to develop exclusively the first broad -based
National Policy on Special Needs Education (SNE) in
Nigeria. The constitution of the drafting committee with
the mandate to formulate a National Policy on Special
Needs Education gave birth to the National Situation
Analysis Report. This implies that the status has
changed to a National Policy on Special Education in 2015 (an expanded version)
thereby widening its scope and activities.

Asia
China

China holds the largest system of education in the world and features a state run public school system under the order of the Ministry of Education.
Japan

Japanese students with special needs are placed in one of four different school arrangements: special schools, special classrooms with another school, in resource rooms (which are called tsukyu), or in regular classrooms. Some local areas such as Koto Ward in Tokyo are expanding these tsukyu (or, Tsubasa Classrooms) to cover all junior high schools within the next few years.

Special schools are reserved for students with severe disabilities who cannot be accommodated in their local school. They do not use the same grading or marking systems as mainstream schools, but instead assess students according to their individualized plans.

Special classes are similar, and may vary the national curriculum as the teachers see fit. Tsukyu are resource rooms that students with milder difficulties use part-time for specialized instruction individually in small groups. These students spend the rest of the day in the mainstream classroom. Some students with special needs are fully included in the mainstream classroom, with accommodations or modifications as needed.

Depending on the local authority, state elementary schools may also hold a Naka-yoshi (中よし, close friends) class group in addition to the 6 grades, where students who struggle to adapt to mainstream classrooms are gathered and given life skills as well as completing their studies at a more adaptable pace. This is different to Tsukyu in that although all-school activities are regularly held together, the majority of time is spent as a class.

Training of disabled students, particularly at the upper-secondary level, emphasizes vocational education to enable students to be as independent as possible within society. Vocational training varies considerably depending on the student's disability, but the options are limited for some. It is clear that the government is aware of the necessity of broadening the range of possibilities for these students. Advancement to higher education is also a goal of the government, and it struggles to have institutions of higher learning accept more disabled students.

Pakistan

After independence (1947), Pakistan had to face some serious challenges, due to which no proper emphasis was given to special education and even education. Among other reasons, lack of resources, financial as well as human, was the major one in this context. The need and importance of special education was felt in different educational policies of Pakistan in different times. At the first time, in its report, the Commission on National Education (1959) highlighted the importance of special education. After that the Education Policy (1972) and the National Policy and Implementation Programme (1979) gave some importance to this sector. The same was also reflected in different medium-term (five-year) plans. This was felt more seriously when the Directorate General of Special Education, Islamabad formulated a draft National Policy for Special Education in 1986 and revised it in 1988 to bring it in line with the emerging needs of the disabled population. After that a special education policy was launched in 1999. Recently, Government of Pakistan has launched a new National Policy for Persons with Disabilities 2002, which is dynamically being implemented.

Singapore
Special education is regulated centrally by the Singapore Ministry of Education. Both special schools and integration into mainstream schools are options for students with special educational needs, but most disabled students are placed in special schools.

Disabled students who want accommodations on national exams must provide appropriate documentation to prove that they are disabled. Accommodations, but not modifications (e.g., simpler questions) are normally approved if they are similar to the accommodations already being used in everyday schoolwork, with the goal of maintaining the exam's integrity while not having students unfairly disadvantaged by factors that are unrelated to what is being tested. The accommodations are listed on the Primary School Leaving Exam.

Australia
Australian Association of Special Education Inc (AASE)'s position is informed by the Disability Standards for Education 2005 which require that disabled students are treated on the same basis as other students in regards to enrollment and participation in education.

With respect to standardized tests, special consideration procedures are in place in all states for disabled students. Students must provide documentation. Not all desired forms of accommodations are available. For example, students who cannot read, even if the inability to read is due to a disability, cannot have the exam read to them, because the exam results should accurately show that the student is unable to read. Reports on matriculation exams do not mention whether the student received any accommodations in taking the test.

Europe
Each country in Europe has its own special education support structures. Thirty-one European countries are covered by the European Agency for Special Needs and Inclusive Education.

Bulgaria

Czech Republic

Schools must take students' special education needs into account when assessing their achievements. Disabled students are normally included in their neighborhood school, although may be placed in special schools.

Denmark

In Denmark, 99% of students with specific learning difficulties such as dyslexia are educated alongside students without any learning challenges.

Finland

Schools adapt the national guidelines to the needs of individual students. Students with special educational needs are given an individualized plan.

They may be exempted from some parts of school examinations, such as students with hearing impairments not taking listening comprehension tests. If the student receives modifications to the school-leaving exams, this is noted on the certificate of achievement. If they are not following the national core curriculum, then they are tested according to the goals of their individual educational program.

France

French students with disabilities are normally included in their neighborhood school, although children may be placed in special schools if their personalized plan calls for it. Each student's personalized school plan describes teaching methods, psychological, medical and paramedical services that the school will provide to the student.

Germany

Most students with special needs in Germany attend a special school that serves only children with special needs. These include:
 Förderschule für Lernbehinderte (special school for learning disabilities): for children who have challenges that impair learning
 Förderschule mit dem Förderschwerpunkt Geistige Entwicklung (school for cognitive development): for children with very severe learning challenges
 Förderschule Schwerpunkt emotionale und soziale Entwicklung (school for emotional and social development): for children who have special emotional needs
 Förderschule für Blinde (school for the blind): for blind children
 Förderschule für Sehbehinderte (school for the visually impaired): for children who are visually disabled
 Förderschule für Gehörlose (school for the deaf): for deaf children
 Förderschule für Schwerhörige (school for the hearing impaired): for children who are hearing impaired
 Förderschule für Körperbehinderte (school for children with physical disabilities): for children with physical disabilities
 Förderschule für Sprachbehinderte (school for children with language disorders): for children with language disorders
 Förderschule für Taubblinde (school for the deafblind): for children who are deafblind
 Schule für Kranke (school for ill children): for children who are too ill to attend school or are hospitalized for a longer period of time.
 Förderschule für schwer mehrfach Behinderte (school for children with severe and multiple disabilities): for children with severe and multiple disabilities who need very special care and attention. Sometimes these children are only susceptible for very basic emotional and sensory stimulation. Thus teachers at these school (as well as at schools for the deafblind) are highly specialized professionals.

One in 21 German students attends a special school. Teachers at those schools are specially trained professionals who have specialized in special needs education while in university. Special schools often have a very favorable student-teacher ratio and facilities other schools do not have.

Some special needs children in Germany do not attend a special school, but are educated in a mainstream school such as a Hauptschule or Gesamtschule (comprehensive school).

Students with special educational needs may be exempted from standardized tests or given modified tests.

Greece

Greek students with special needs may attend either mainstream schools or special schools.

Students whose disabilities have been certified may be exempted from some standardized tests or given alternative tests. Accommodations are responsive to students' needs; for example, students with visual impairments may take oral tests, and students with hearing impairments take written tests. Accommodations and modifications are noted on the certificate of achievement.

Hungary
Special education is regulated centrally.

According to the 1993 Act on Public Education, students with special educational needs may be exempted from standardized tests or given modified tests. They have a right to extra time, a choice of formats for the tests (e.g., oral rather than written), and any equipment that they normally use during the school day.

As of 2006, disabled students received a significant bonus (eight points) on the university entrance examination, which has been criticized as unfair.

Republic of Ireland
The National Council for Special Education (NCSE) supports students with physical and intellectual disabilities.

The Netherlands

As a general rule, students with special educational needs are integrated into their regular, mainstream schools with appropriate support, under the "Going to School Together" policy (Weer Samen Naar School). Four types of disability-specific special schools exist. The national policy is moving towards "suitable education" (passend onderwijs), based on the individual's strengths and weaknesses.

A strong emphasis is placed on the specific needs and positive capabilities of the individual, rather than on limitations. Disabilities are normally documented by experts.

Norway

The National Support System for Special Needs Education (Statped) is managed by the Norwegian Directorate for Education and Training. The general objective for Statped is to give guidance and support to those in charge of the education in municipalities and county administrations to ensure that children, young people and adults with major and special educational needs are secured well-advised educational and developmental provisions. The institutions affiliated with Statped offer a broad spectrum of services. Statped consists of 13 resource centres owned by the State, and 4 units for special education, where Statped buys services. These centres offer special educational guidance and support for local authorities and county administrations.

Portugal

Disabled students have a "guaranteed right" to appropriate accommodations on assessments. Schools are generally considered autonomous.

Slovenia

On national tests, the National Examination Center normally grants most requests for accommodations that are supported by the local school's examination committee. Legislation opposes the use of modifications that would be unfair to non-disabled students.

Spain

Schools are required to provide services and resources to students with special educational needs so that they make progress and participate in school. If the local school is unable to provide appropriately for an individual student, then the student may be transferred to a special school.

Spanish non-governmental organizations like ONCE have traditionally provided significant services to disabled students.

Sweden

Local schools have significant autonomy, based on national guidelines. Schools are expected to help students meet the goals that are set for them.

There are special schools for students with low abilities to attend normal education. In 2012 and 2013, the media criticized how students with disabilities that are considered more mild, such as dyslexia, have been placed in special schools, saying that this may seriously hamper their chances on the labour market.

Switzerland

Education is controlled by the 26 cantons, and so special education programs vary from place to place. However, integration is typical. Students are assessed according to their individual learning goals.

United Kingdom

In England and Wales, the acronym SEN (for Special Educational Needs) denotes the condition of having special educational needs, the services which provide the support and the programmes and staff which implement the education. In England SEN PPS refers to the Special Educational Needs Parent Partnership Service. SENAS is the special educational needs assessment service, which is part of the Local Authority. SENCO refers to a special educational needs coordinator, who usually works with schools and the children within schools who have special educational needs. The Special Educational Needs Parent Partnership Services help parents with the planning and delivery of their child's educational provision. The Department for Education oversees special education in England.

Most students have an individual educational plan, but students may have a group plan in addition to, or instead of, an individual plan. Group plans are used when a group of students all have similar goals.

In Scotland the Additional Support Needs Act places an obligation on education authorities to meet the needs of all students in consultation with other agencies and parents. In Scotland the term Special Educational Needs (SEN), and its variants are not official terminology although the very recent implementation of the Additional Support for Learning Act means that both SEN and ASN (Additional Support Needs) are used interchangeably in current common practice.

Turkey
At a young age students who have special needs in Turkey are provided special education from The Ministry of Education, who are responsible in giving them the education that they need.

In order to get special education you are required certain things:
 "Residency certificate 
 Written application by the parents to the school administration 
 Personal development report of the child (if already registered) 
 Child's health report from the hospital."
All special-needs students receive an Individualized Education Program (BEP) that outlines how the school will meet the student's individual needs. The Özel Eğitim Kurumları Yönetmeliği (ÖEKY) requires that students with special needs be provided with a Free Appropriate Public Education in the Least Restrictive Environment that is appropriate to the student's needs. Government-run schools provide special education in varying degrees from the least restrictive settings, such as full inclusion, to the most restrictive settings, such as segregation in a special school.

The education offered by the school must be appropriate to the student's individual needs. Schools are not required to maximize the student's potential or to provide the best possible services. Unlike most of the developed world, American schools are also required to provide many medical services, such as speech therapy, if the student needs these services.

According to the Department of Education, approximately 10 percent of all school-aged children currently receive some type of special education services.

As with most countries in the world, students who are poor, ethnic minorities, or do not speak the dominant language fluently are disproportionately identified as needing special education services.

Poor people and refugees are more likely to have limited resources and to employ inexperienced teachers that do not cope well with student behavior problems, "thereby increasing the number of students they referred to special education." Teacher efficacy, tolerance, gender, and years of experience and special education referrals.

Latin America 
Before 1978, little action was taken to educate disabled children in Colombia. Children would be left home without much interaction with the outside world. In 1985, special education was researched across the country and education programs were created. After 1990, disabled people were given access to public school classes. The increase in advocation for accessibility for disabled children was initiated by the awareness and recognition of the rights of this group of children to education. While there has been improvement over recent years, there is still slow development for special education programs and special education policy.

Colombia 
Statistics from DANE (Departamento Administrativo Nacional de Estadística) state that there are 2,624,898 disabled people who reside in Colombia, representing 6.3% of the country's population. According to 2010 research 90% of disabled students in Colombia did not attend a mainstream school, and only 26% of them are able to attend school at all.

The history of special education in Colombia can be categorized into three time periods: the period of neglect, the period of diagnosis and planning, and the emergence of special education. The period of planning ran from the years 1978 to the year 1990. The Ministry of Colombia in 1995 implemented a national plan for the development of special education called "Plan Nacional para el Desarrollo de la Educación Especial". The purposes of the plan was to create a national diagnosis of special education and to initiate programs for individuals with disabilities. In 1994, the Ministry of education put the first law into action to introduce special classes in public schools that include disabled students, called Law 115. In 2011, Colombia entered into the Convention of Rights of Persons with Disabilities, an agreement among the United Nations Education Scientific and Culture Organization(UNESCO) to protect people who live with disabilities.

The most recent development of special education in Colombia was Article 11 of Law 1618, which was passed in 2013. The law states that "the Ministry of Education will define the policy and regulate the scheme of education for persons with special educational needs, promoting educational access and quality under a system based on inclusion in the educational services". The Colombian government has also made financial strides into special education, investing over $12.3 million in 2015.

North America
In North America, special education is commonly abbreviated as special ed, SpecEd, SPED, or SpEd in a professional context.

Canada
Education in Canada is the responsibility of the individual provinces and territories. As such, rules vary somewhat from place to place. However, inclusion is the dominant model.

For major exams, Canadian schools commonly use accommodations, such as specially printed examinations for visually impaired students, when assessing the achievements of students with special needs. In other instances, disabled students may receive alternative assessments or modifications that simplify tests, or they may be exempted from the tests entirely.

United States

All special-needs students receive an Individualized Education Program (IEP) that outlines how the school will meet the student's individual needs. The Individuals with Disabilities Education Act (IDEA) requires that students with special needs be provided with a Free Appropriate Public Education in the Least Restrictive Environment that is appropriate to the student's needs. Government-run schools provide special education in varying degrees from the least restrictive settings, such as full inclusion, to the most restrictive settings, such as receiving special education services at home or hospital.

The education offered by the school must be appropriate to the student's individual needs. Schools are not required to maximize the student's potential or to provide the best possible services. Unlike most of the developed world, American schools are also required to provide many medical services, such as speech therapy, if the student needs these services.

According to the Department of Education, approximately 6 million children (roughly 10 percent of all school-aged children) currently receive some type of special education services. As with most countries in the world, students who are poor, ethnic minorities, or do not speak the dominant language fluently are disproportionately identified as needing special education services. Poor, black and Latino urban schools are more likely to have limited resources and to employ inexperienced teachers that do not cope well with student behavior problems, "thereby increasing the number of students they referred to special education."

During the 1960s, in some part due to the civil rights movement, some researchers began to study the disparity of education amongst people with disabilities. The landmark Brown v. Board of Education decision, which declared unconstitutional the "separate but equal" arrangements in public schools for students of different races, paved the way for PARC v. Commonwealth of Pennsylvania and Mills vs. Board of Education of District of Columbia, which challenged the segregation of students with special needs. Courts ruled that unnecessary and inappropriate segregation of disabled students was unconstitutional. Congress responded to these court rulings with the federal Education for All Handicapped Children Act in 1975 (since renamed the Individuals with Disabilities Education Act (IDEA)). This law required schools to provide services to students previously denied access to an appropriate education.

In US government-run schools, the dominant model is inclusion. In the United States, three out of five students with academic learning challenges spend the overwhelming majority of their time in the regular classroom.

Integrating technology in special education classrooms

Autism 
Autism, or Autism Spectrum Disorder (ASD), refers to a range of conditions. These conditions involve challenges with social skills, repetitive behaviors, speech and nonverbal communication. They also involve unique strengths and differences.

Autism is a disability that impairs the social interactions and communication skills of a person. People who are autistic tend to think and act differently from others. Many autistic children find themselves comfortable with a device in their hands. For students with autism, there are apps called "visual scene displays" that are most helpful for children who are having difficulty with verbal skills, according to Jules Csillag, a speech–language pathologist who focuses on special ed tech. Apps such as SceneSpeak and Speech with Milo help autistic children develop storytelling skills with text-to-speech voice and interactive storybooks. Using apps like these in a classroom can improve autistic student's verbal skills.

There are several controversies surrounding the diagnoses and causes of autism. It is now believed that there is no single cause of autism. Research seems to suggest that autism is normally the result of both genetic and environmental influences.

Down syndrome 
If a student has Down syndrome, assistive technology can help with their learning experience. Author of Down Syndrome: A Promising Future, Together, Terry Hassold, who got his PhD in human genetics, explains that students with Down syndrome have delays with cognitive ability. Their brains have a late reaction when their neurological system sends a message for any task. Because of this late reaction, they tend to take longer to complete a task than an average student. Assistive technology is crucial in helping students with Down syndrome with their writing ability. Children with Down syndrome tend to have shorter fingers and a lowered thumb making their ability to write more difficult. Also, some of the usual wrist bones are not formed, making it difficult to hold objects. Slanted desks are one type of assisted technology that can aid in the successful ability to write. A three-ring binder can be used to create a slanted desk by turning the binder sideways. Also, students with Down syndrome often try to hold their pencils by anchoring them against the thumb rather than using the tip of their thumb. Shortened pencils or triangular-shaped pencils encourage students to hold them correctly. Using any of these assistive technologies can help students with Down syndrome during their educational process.

Special education and sports

Benefits 
Many people with special needs are denied when they want to participate in a sport. In the U.S., the Office for Civil Rights ensures students with disabilities always have opportunities to participate in extracurricular athletics equal to other students. Special education students can benefit from sports in many ways. For example, studies show it boosts self confidence and improves the participant's skills in relationship building and working as part of a team.

Types of sports 
Just about any sport can be altered for special education purposes. Some of the popular sports are swimming, wheel chair soccer, handball, gymnastics, and weightlifting.

Organizations and programs 
Many competitive organizations are available for special needs student athletes. For example, the Special Olympics is an annual, world-wide competition held for disabled children that want to participate in sports. Other organizations include the Paralympic Games and Unified Sports, the latter which pairs participants with and without intellectual disabilities on the same team. Educational institutions can also promote Adapted Physical Education, which tailors sports for students with certain disabilities. Organizations like S.T.R.I.D.E. Adaptive Sports help educational institutions in providing opportunities for special education student athletes. Some of these sports might include wheelchair basketball or sledge hockey.

Some sports even have their own organizations. For example, in baseball athletes can participate in the Miracle League or Little League Challenger Division. Another organization that soccer athletes can participate in US Youth Soccer TOPSoccer or Just for Kicks.

Other sports which can be played or adapted include track & field, quad rugby, tennis, bowling, and skiing.

Impact
A 2021 study that examined the impact of a sharp reduction in the provision of special education services in Texas found that this policy change substantially reduced the high school completion rates and college enrollment rates of the students who were denied access to special education.

See also
 Adapted physical education
 Disability and poverty
 Disability studies
 Disadvantaged
 Early childhood intervention
 Inclusive
 Learning environment
 Learning space
 Mainstreaming in education
 Matching person and technology model
 Post Secondary Transition for High School Students with Disabilities
 Reasonable accommodation
 Response to intervention
 Special Assistance Program (Australian education)
 Special needs
 Supported employment services
 Tracking (education)
 Vocational rehabilitation
 Washington County Closed-Circuit Educational Television Project

References

Sources

Further reading

 Birsh, Judith R., & Wolf, B., eds. (2011). Multisensory Teaching of Basic Language Skills, Third Edition. Baltimore: Brookes.
 Wilmshurst, L., & Brue, A. W. (2010). The complete guide to special education (2nd ed.). San Francisco: Jossey-Bass.
 
 Snell, M. E. & Brown, F. (1987, 2011). Instruction of Students with Severe Disabilities. (7th edition). Seoul: Pearson.

External links

The European Agency for Special Needs and Inclusive Education
Center for Parent Information and Resources (US)
Council for Exceptional Children (US)
Office of Special Education and Rehabilitative Services U.S. Department of Education
Guide to Special Education Terms & Acronyms (US)

 
Alternative education
Educational programs
Segregation